Susan Kerslake (born 1943) is a Canadian writer. She was a shortlisted nominee for the Books in Canada First Novel Award in 1976 for Middlewatch, and for the Governor General's Award for English-language fiction at the 1984 Governor General's Awards for The Book of Fears.

Born in Chicago, Illinois, Kerslake emigrated to Canada in 1966, residing in Halifax, Nova Scotia.

Works
Middlewatch (1976)
Penumbra (1984)
The Book of Fears (1984)
Blind Date (1989)
Seasoning Fever (2002)

References

1943 births
Living people
Canadian women short story writers
Canadian women novelists
Writers from Chicago
American emigrants to Canada
20th-century Canadian women writers
21st-century Canadian women writers
20th-century Canadian short story writers
21st-century Canadian short story writers
20th-century Canadian novelists
21st-century Canadian novelists